

The Porterfield Model 35 Flyabout was an American two-seat cabin monoplane built by the Porterfield Aircraft Corporation of Kansas City.

Development
The aircraft was designed by Noel Hockaday and was built by students at the Wyandotte High School as the Wyandotte Pup. Porterfield Aircraft recognised the potential of the aircraft design and bought the design rights and also the services of Hockaday as works manager and designer. The Pup was developed to appear in 1935 as the Porterfield Model 35 Flyabout a braced high-wing-monoplane. It had a fixed tailskid landing gear and room for two. It was originally powered by a 60 hp (45 kW) LeBlond 5D radial engine. Variants later appeared with different engine installations and a deluxe model the De Luxe Sport. Over 240 aircraft were built.

Variants
35
1935 production variant with a 60hp (45kW) LeBlond 5D radial engine
35-70  Flyabout
1937 production variant with a 70hp (52kW) LeBlond 5DE radial engine.
35-V
Variant powered by a 65hp (48kW) Velie M-5 engine.
35-W
Luxury model (also known as the Model 90) with a 90hp (67kW) Warner Scarab Junior radial engine.
Porterfield 75-C
75hp Continental A-75
Porterfield 90 (De Luxe Sport)
Sporty, deluxe version of 35-W

Operators

Royal New Zealand Air Force

Specifications (Model 35-70)

See also

References

Bibliography

 The Illustrated Encyclopedia of Aircraft (Part Work 1982-1985), 1985, Orbis Publishing, Page 2760

1930s United States civil utility aircraft
High-wing aircraft
Single-engined tractor aircraft
Aircraft first flown in 1935